Yngvar Hafsund Karlsen (4 June 1920 – 28 July 2001) was a Norwegian speed skater, born in Eidanger.  He competed at the 1952 Winter Olympics in Oslo, in 5,000 and 10,000 m.

References

1920 births
2001 deaths
Sportspeople from Porsgrunn
Norwegian male speed skaters
Olympic speed skaters of Norway
Speed skaters at the 1952 Winter Olympics